Admiral Robert Lee Dennison (April 13, 1901 – March 14, 1980) was an American naval officer and aide to President Harry Truman.

Early life
Dennison was born in Warren, Pennsylvania, and graduated from the United States Naval Academy in 1923. He later received a doctorate in engineering from Johns Hopkins University.

Naval career
Truman twice sailed on the Missouri while Dennison commanded it. He was a naval aide to Harry Truman from 1948 to 1953.

Arleigh Burke, a former classmate of Dennison's who would one day become Chief of Naval Operations, found his career on the brink of ruin, following the Revolt of the Admirals. At the request of Dennison, Truman became involved. As a result, Burke's career stayed on track.

Dennison was involved in some of the first American continuity of government planning operations. He was the Commander in Chief of the United States Atlantic Fleet and United States Atlantic Command from February 28, 1960 to April 30, 1963. While in charge of the Atlantic forces, he was given the duty of blockading Cuba during the Cuban Missile Crisis.

Dennison died of a pulmonary embolism in 1980 at the Bethesda Naval Hospital.

References

1901 births
1980 deaths
United States Navy admirals
United States Naval Academy alumni
United States Navy personnel of World War II
Johns Hopkins University alumni
People from Warren County, Pennsylvania
Military aides to the President of the United States
Burials at Arlington National Cemetery
Military personnel from Pennsylvania